The marble goby (Oxyeleotris marmorata) is a widely distributed species of fish in the family Butidae native to fresh and brackish waters of the Mekong and Chao Praya basins, as well as rivers and other water bodies in Cambodia (where it is called ត្រីដំរី "TreiDamrei"),  Thailand (where it is called ปลาบู่), Malaysia, Singapore, Indochina, the Philippines, and Indonesia.

This species is an economically important fish, being sought after by local commercial fisheries and farmed.  It can also be found in the aquarium trade. It is highly popular among the Chinese community due to its fine texture and tasty white flesh, and is believed to have healing properties. It is said, best eaten after surgeries or childbirths.  In Malaysia, commercialization of this type of fish is not widely established. Demands are largely dependent on wild populations, thus fetching high prices in the market. In Thailand, this species has been cited in to the folk tale of Central Thailand's  ("ปลาบู่ทอง"; golden goby) tales have known as well, and was taken to create a television series and movies several times. The content is similar to Cinderella.

References

Oxyeleotris
Fish of Southeast Asia
Fish described in 1852